

The Polikarpov Ivanov was a 1930s prototype Soviet ground attack monoplane designed by Polikarpov for a soviet government procurement competition codenamed Ivanov.

Design
The Ivanov was an all-metal low-wing monoplane with a retractable conventional landing gear and powered by a  Shevtsov M-62 radial engine. It was fitted with four wing-mounted ShKAS machine guns with a moveable turret-mounted Berezin UBT fitted at the rear of the cockpit area.

Development
Two prototypes were under construction in 1938 and the first was tested from February to August 1938. The Ivanov was found to need better flying qualities and with the competing Kharkov R-10 already in production the second prototype was not completed and the programme was abandoned.

Specifications

See also
Kharkov KhAI-5 winner of the Ivanov competition
Tupolev ANT-51 a competitor in the Ivanvov competition

References

Notes

Bibliography

 
 

1930s Soviet attack aircraft
Ivanov